La Yesca Dam is an embankment dam on the Santiago River  northwest of Guadalajara on the border of Mexico's Nayarit and Jalisco states. Construction on the dam began in 2007 after Empresas ICA was awarded the main construction contract. The dam was inaugurated by President Felipe Calderón on 6 November 2012. The dam supports a 750 MW hydroelectric power station and is part of the Hydroelectric System Santiago. Its construction will improve the regulation of water flow and subsequently power generation downstream at the El Cajón and Aguamilpa Dams.

Design
On the dam's left bank is a spillway controlled by six radial gates. The power station contains two 375 MW Francis turbine generators producing an estimated annual generation of 1,210 GWh.

See also

List of power stations in Mexico

References

Dams in Mexico
Hydroelectric power stations in Mexico
Dams completed in 2012
Concrete-face rock-fill dams
Dams on the Río Grande de Santiago
2012 establishments in Mexico
Energy infrastructure completed in 2012
Buildings and structures in Nayarit
Buildings and structures in Jalisco